Pelle Linders (born September 21, 1975 in Onsala, Sweden) is a Swedish handball player, currently playing for Danish Handball League side FCK Håndbold, with whom he won the Danish Championship in 2008. He has previously played for numerous clubs, including IFK Skövde in his homeland and FCK Håndbold's Danish League rivals from KIF Kolding. He also had a spell at German League side THW Kiel, who he helped to a Champions League victory.

Linders has made 65 appearances for the Swedish national handball team.

External links
 player info 

1975 births
Living people
Swedish expatriate sportspeople in Denmark
Swedish expatriate sportspeople in Germany
Swedish male handball players
KIF Kolding players